Santiago Martínez may refer to:

Santiago Martínez (equestrian) (born 1912), Spanish Olympic equestrian
Santiago Martínez Delgado (1906–1954), Colombian painter, sculptor, art historian and writer
Santiago Martínez (weightlifter) (born 1979), Spanish male weightlifter
Santiago Martínez (footballer, born 1991), Uruguayan footballer
Santiago Martinez (footballer, born 1995), Paraguayan footballer
Santiago Martínez (footballer, born 1998), Colombian footballer